Cynometra suaheliensis is a species of plant in the family Fabaceae. It is found in Kenya and Tanzania.

Taxonomy

References

suaheliensis
Flora of Kenya
Flora of Tanzania
Vulnerable plants
Taxonomy articles created by Polbot